Alexander Tanner Marshall (born June 28, 1989) is an American musician and former pianist/guitarist for the American rock band The Cab.

Career

The Cab (2004–2014)
In late 2005, The Cab became a full band with guitarist Paul Garcia, guitar/pianist Alex Marshall, and drummer Alex Johnson, playing its first show at The Alley in Las Vegas.  The band signed to local label Olympus Records in January 2006 but released no material. The Cab was signed to Fueled By Ramen/Decaydance in 2007 and released their debut album, Whisper War, in April 2008. In June 2011, The Cab left Fueled By Ramen/Decaydance, and released their second album, Symphony Soldier, independently on August 23, 2011. In 2012 the band signed a major-label record deal with Universal Republic Records. Just days before the release of a new album, Marshall announced he was leaving the group with no specific reason. "Lock Me Up" was released in 2014 featuring Marshall.

Solo career (2014–present)
Marshall released his debut single "Hurricane" on July 1, 2016 and will be featured on his debut EP.But it's been more than 5 years and there is no new information about his so called upcoming debut EP

Discography
with The Cab
 Whisper War (2008)
 Symphony Soldier  (2011)

Solo
 "Hurricane" (2016)
 "My Girl" (2016)

References

1989 births
Living people
American rock pianists
American rock guitarists
American rock singers
American male singer-songwriters
American singer-songwriters